German submarine U-3519 was a Type XXI U-boat of Nazi Germany's Kriegsmarine during World War II. The Elektroboote submarine was laid down on 19 September 1944 at the Schichau-Werke yard at Danzig, launched on 23 November 1944, and commissioned on 6 January 1945 under the command of Kapitänleutnant Richard von Harpe.

U-3519 was a brand new, high technology electric boat which could run constantly submerged rather than having to surface to recharge her batteries every day the way submarines until that point had had to do. However, these advanced vessels were introduced to the Kriegsmarine only late in 1944, much too late to influence the Battle of the Atlantic, and too late for many of them to serve in an offensive capacity at all.

With the end of the war near, training on U-boats had dropped to a minimum due to lack of fuel, falling morale and the effectiveness of allied attacks on U-boat construction and preparation. The exception to this were the new Type XXI boats, which continued to train in the Baltic Sea. To prevent this, the Royal Air Force dropped thousands of sea mines into German territorial waters, in the hope that submarines entering or leaving harbour or training in shallow waters would be lost on them. This is what destroyed U-3519 on 2 March 1945, when she ran afoul of an air-dropped mine near Warnemünde, in position  and sank to the bottom taking all 65 of her crew with her.

Design
Like all Type XXI U-boats, U-3519 had a displacement of  when at the surface and  while submerged. The submarine was powered by two MAN SE supercharged six-cylinder M6V40/46KBB diesel engines each providing , two Siemens-Schuckert GU365/30 double-acting electric motors each providing , and two Siemens-Schuckert silent running GV232/28 electric motors each providing .

U-3519 was fitted with six  torpedo tubes in the bow and four  C/30 anti-aircraft guns. She could carry twenty-three torpedoes or seventeen torpedoes and twelve mines. The complement was five officers and fifty-two men.

References

Bibliography

External links
 

World War II submarines of Germany
Type XXI submarines
U-boats sunk by mines
World War II shipwrecks in the Baltic Sea
U-boats commissioned in 1945
U-boats sunk in 1945
1944 ships
Ships built in Danzig
Ships built by Schichau
Maritime incidents in March 1945